Knowledge Ecology International (KEI) is a non-governmental organization. It was founded by Ralph Nader in 1995 and was then called Consumer Project on Technology.  It deals with issues related to the effects of intellectual property on public health, cyberlaw and e-commerce, and competition policy.  It has fought the Microsoft monopoly, the ICANN monopoly, software patents, and business method patents.  It has supported free software in government, open access for the Internet, and privacy regulation.  KEI works on access to medicines, including a major effort on compulsory licensing of patents.  Beginning in 2002, CPTech began to work with Tim Hubbard and others on a new trade framework for medical research and development (R&D).  In the context of current bilateral agreements, this is referred to as R&D+, which in contrast to TRIPS+ approaches.

KEI is also working with a number of other NGOs to change the mission of the World Intellectual Property Organization (WIPO), so that it operates more like a true UN agency, with a social rather than a commercial agenda.

The organization is directed by James Love.

See also
 Patent thicket
 Tragedy of the anticommons

External links
 Knowledge Ecology Website

Intellectual property organizations
Non-profit organizations based in the United States
Organizations established in 1995
Ralph Nader
Access to Knowledge movement